Eliza Jean Reid (born 5 May 1976) is a Canadian-Icelandic writer and, since 2016, the First Lady of Iceland through her marriage to Icelandic President Guðni Th. Jóhannesson. Before becoming First Lady she co-founded the Iceland Writers Retreat, was a freelance writer for multiple Icelandic magazines and editor of the Icelandair Stopover from 2012 to 2016.

Early life and education
Reid was born on 5 May 1976 in Ottawa, Ontario, Canada. She moved with her family to Ashton, Ontario, as a child. After moving, she attended Bell High School in Nepean, Ontario. As a student at Trinity College, University of Toronto, Reid became a choral scholar and served as Head of College. After she moved to Iceland she sang for the Hallgrímskirkja Motet Choir. After she graduated from the University of Toronto with a bachelor's degree in international relations, she went to St Antony's College, Oxford University, to complete an MA degree in modern history.

Career

Reid ran the summer student volunteer program at the Toronto Hospital for Sick Children in 1998, and volunteered for the Red Cross in Iceland. Reid later worked in sales from 1999 to 2003 and in marketing until 2004.

After her move to Iceland in 2003, Reid became a freelance writer for multiple Icelandic publications. She wrote for The Reykjavík Grapevine and Iceland Review from 2005 to 2008 and became an editor for Icelandair Stopover in 2012. She co-founded the Iceland Writers Retreat in 2014, an event which has garnered international acclaim.

She served on the jury of the 2018 British Columbia's National Award for Canadian Non-Fiction.

Eliza has been nominated for 'Person of the Year' by multiple Icelandic media outlets.

In October 2020 her book Secrets of the Sprakkar: Iceland's Extraordinary Women and How They Are Changing the World was announced, and has been published by Sourcebooks in the US and Simon & Schuster in Canada in 2022.  The book was well-received and gained endorsements from numerous high-profile authors, as well as from Hillary Clinton, and became a national bestseller in Canada.

Causes
She is patron of several organizations in Iceland, including the United Nations Association Iceland and is also a Goodwill Ambassador for SOS Children’s Villages Iceland. In September 2017, Reid visited the Za’atari refugee camp in Jordan at the invitation of UN Women. On March 23, 2019 she accepted an invitation to visit the Mosque in Iceland.

Reid loves to travel and has made solo-trips to many countries. In 2017, she was named a United Nations Special Ambassador for Tourism and the Sustainable Development Goals.

She has advocated the recycling of clothing by making public appearances in clothing she purchased from local Red Cross stores. Eliza has spoken on several occasions about her disdain for shopping.

Feminism and gender-equality
Reid is known as a vocal proponent and advocate for women's rights and gender-parity. In 2019, she was honored in Berlin with an award on International Women's Day. On June 19, 2017, during the 102nd anniversary of women's right to vote in Iceland, Reid advocated for gender rights and acknowledged there is still much work for Iceland to do in this regard. In March 2018, Reid gave a keynote speech at the Young Women Business Leaders.

On 31 August 2019, Reid used her public Facebook page to respond to an opinion article by Zoe Williams in the British newspaper The Guardian, which criticized the media coverage of the spouses of global leaders attending the 2019 G7 conference, writing "I make a concerted effort not to be seen as an accessory to my husband". She has also been vocal about the undefined nature of being the partner of a head of state, and the perils and opportunities of that situation.

On 4 September 2019, Reid was the subject of political and media speculation for wearing a white pantsuit to a meeting with US Vice President Michael Pence and Second Lady Karen Pence in Reykjavik, which many saw as a symbol of solidarity with other global gender parity initiatives such as #TimesUp #MeToo and modern day Women's Rights and Suffragettes movements. She wore a rainbow bracelet on her wrist to the Pence meeting as well, which has been seen as a show of solidarity with the LGBTQA community. The President of Iceland wore a bracelet to the same meeting and has worn the bracelet to meetings with Vladimir Putin.

In October 2021, Reid directed attention to the marginalizing practices of the media, after they left her name off of a photo credit after the visit to Iceland by the Crown Prince of Denmark, asking "do women exist?"

Patronages
 Alzheimer's Society
 Eyrarrosin, an annual award for outstanding cultural projects in Iceland’s rural regions
 Ferskir Vindar art exhibition 
 Pieta House for suicide- and self-harm prevention
 Society of Lung Patients
 SOS Children's Villages Iceland (Goodwill Ambassador)
 United Nations Association Iceland 
 United Nations Special Ambassador for Tourism and the Sustainable Development Goals

Personal life
In 2004, Reid married historian Guðni Th. Jóhannesson, who became President of Iceland in 2016. The couple have four children together. She is the sister of Canadian writer Iain Reid.

Honors

Icelandic honors
 Grand Cross of the Order of the Falcon (1 August 2016)

Foreign honors
 : Dame Grand Cross of the Order of the Dannebrog (24 January 2017)
 : Grand Cross of the Order of the White Rose of Finland (31 May 2017)
 : Grand Cross 1st class of the Order of Merit of the Federal Republic of Germany (12 June 2019)
 : Dame Grand Cross of the Royal Norwegian Order of Merit (21 March 2017)
 : Commander Grand Cross of the Order of the Polar Star. (17 January 2018)

References

External links
 
Official Facebook page

Living people
1976 births
Eliza Reid
Magazine writers
Canadian emigrants to Iceland
University of Toronto alumni
Alumni of St Antony's College, Oxford
Writers from Ottawa
Recipients of the Order of the Falcon
Grand Crosses of the Order of the Dannebrog
Order of the White Rose of Finland
Commanders Grand Cross of the Order of the Polar Star
Grand Crosses 1st class of the Order of Merit of the Federal Republic of Germany